Will Morgan (born November 1966) is a Minnesota politician and former member of the Minnesota House of Representatives. A member of the Minnesota Democratic–Farmer–Labor Party (DFL), he represented District 56B, which includes portions of Dakota County in the southern Twin Cities metropolitan area. He is a physics teacher at Burnsville High School in Burnsville.

Minnesota House of Representatives
Morgan was first elected in 2006, defeating incumbent Republican Rep. Duke Powell. He was re-elected in 2008, but was unseated by Republican Pam Myhra in the 2010 general election.

On November 6, 2012, Morgan defeated Republican challenger Roz Peterson to return to the Legislature.

References

External links

 Rep. Morgan official web page

1966 births
Living people
People from Burnsville, Minnesota
Democratic Party members of the Minnesota House of Representatives
21st-century American politicians